Vasiliǐ Matveievitch Czernajew was a Russian botanist responsible for collecting and describing at least 5 new genera and 9 new species of fungi between 1822 and 1839. His name is written in the Cyrillic alphabet and has appeared in scientific documentation with a number of different romanizations, including V. Czernajev, Basil Matveievich Czerniaiev, B.M. Czernaiev, B.M. Czernjaëv, B.M. Czernjaëw, V.M. Tschernaiew, V. Tschernajef, and V. Czerniaier, although the official abbreviation seems to be consistently written as Czern.

Career

Czernajew was a botany professor at the University of Kharkiv and the director of the botanical garden there.

Bibliography

References

External links

1796 births
1871 deaths
19th-century botanists from the Russian Empire
Scientists from Kharkiv
People from Zemlyansky Uyezd